Justice Henderson may refer to:

Frank Henderson (South Dakota politician), associate justice of the South Dakota Supreme Court
Henry P. Henderson, associate justice of the Utah Supreme Court
Leonard Henderson, chief justice of the North Carolina Supreme Court
Thelton E. Henderson, chief judge of the Federal District Court, Northern District of California
William L. Henderson, chief judge of the Maryland Court of Appeals